The 2005 All-Ireland Minor Hurling Championship was the 75th staging of the All-Ireland Minor Hurling Championship since its establishment by the Gaelic Athletic Association in 1928. The championship began on 31 March 2005 and ended on 11 September 2005.

Galway entered the championship as the defending champions.

On 11 September 2005, Galway won the championship following a 3-12 to 0-17 defeat of Limerick in the All-Ireland final. This was their second All-Ireland title in succession.

Limerick's Eoin Ryan was the championship's top scorer with 4-40.

Results

Leinster Minor Hurling Championship

Group stage

Quarter-finals

Semi-finals

Final

Munster Minor Hurling Championship

Quarter-finals

Playoffs

Kerry withdrew from the championship in this round.

Semi-finals

Final

Ulster Minor Hurling Championship

Semi-final

Final

All-Ireland Minor Hurling Championship

Quarter-finals

Semi-finals

Final

Statistics

Top scorers

Top scorer overall

Top scorers in a single game

Miscellaneous

 Dublin won the Leinster Championship for the first time since 1983.
 Limerick qualified for the All-Ireland final for the first time since 1984.

References

Minor
All-Ireland Minor Hurling Championship